Neuhausen/Spree is a municipality in the district of Spree-Neiße, in Lower Lusatia, Brandenburg, Germany.

History
From 1815 to 1947, Neuhausen was part of the Prussian Province of Brandenburg. From 1952 to 1990, it was part of the Bezirk Cottbus of East Germany.

Demography

Famous people
Paul Bronisch, sculptor
Ronny Ziesmer, gymnast

See also
Cottbus-Neuhausen Airport

References

Populated places in Spree-Neiße